A sighted guide is a person who guides a person with blindness or vision impairment.

Sports

Paralympic Games

At the Paralympic Games there are various classifications of athletes with a visual impairment.

Rules are according to the International Blind Sports Association (IBSA) and the International Paralympic Committee (IPC).

The sighted guides are such a close and essential part of the competition, that the athlete with a visual impairment and the guide are considered a team, and both athletes are medal candidates.

Winter
At the Winter Paralympics there are three classifications of athletes with a visual impairment:
B1 (no useful vision)
B2 (minimal useful vision)
B3 (some useful vision).
A sighted guide is required for B1 and B2, and optional for B3.

Nordic skiing:
The guide can lead, follow, or ski next to the athlete with a visual impairment. The guide assists with voice instruction only. No physical contact allowed.

Alpine skiing:
The start must have an adequate space for the guide.

Combined
Downhill
Giant slalom
Slalom
Super-G

Summer

Athletics:In athletics the sighted guides can win a medal.

Cycling: Pilot
Equestrian:
Football 5-a-side:
Triathlon:

See also
Guide dog
White cane

References

External links
Being a Sighted Guide, American Foundation for the Blind
Sighted Guide Techniques, Braille Institute of America
Video: Guide Running at United States Olympic Committee

Blindness
 
Guides